Mesua elegans is a species of flowering plant in the family Calophyllaceae. It is a tree found in Peninsular Malaysia and Singapore.

References

elegans
Trees of Malaya
Least concern plants
Taxonomy articles created by Polbot